Sara Doorsoun-Khajeh (born 17 November 1991) is a German footballer who plays as a defender for Eintracht Frankfurt and the German national team. She previously played for Wattenscheid 09, Bad Neuenahr, Turbine Potsdam, SGS Essen, VfL Wolfsburg and Eintracht Frankfurt.

Early and personal life
Doorsoun-Khajeh was born in the city of Cologne to an Iranian father and a Turkish mother.

She has been dating German Princess Charming winner Lou Schaaf since 2021.

Club career

VfL Wolfsburg
In her debut season with VfL Wolfsburg, Doorsoun won the 2018–19 Frauen-Bundesliga and the DFB-Pokal. She won the Frauen-Bundesliga and DFB-Pokal again the following season with Wolfsburg. Doorsoun has featured for Wolfsburg during the 2019–20 UEFA Women's Champions League knockout phase, including playing in the 2020 UEFA Women's Champions League Final against Olympique Lyonnais.

International career
Having represented Germany from the under-15 level up, Doorsoun made her debut for the senior Germany women's national football team in 2016 during a 1–0 win over Hungary. She has been called up for the 2016, 2017, and 2018 editions of the SheBelieves Cup, as well as the UEFA Women's Euro 2017 where she played in their 2–0 win over Russia and quarter-final match against Denmark. After providing two assists during Germany's World Cup qualification campaign, she was called into their squad for the 2019 FIFA Women's World Cup. Doorsoun scored her first goal for the senior national team on 31 August 2019 in a UEFA Women's Euro 2022 qualifying match against Montenegro. On 18 June 2022, she was named in Germany's final UEFA Women's Euro 2022 squad. Doorsoun helped Germany reach the UEFA Women's Euro 2022 Final against England with a 2–1 win over France in the semi-final on 27 July 2022.

Career statistics

Club

International

Scores and results list Germany's goal tally first, score column indicates score after each Doorsoun goal.

Honours
VfL Wolfsburg
Frauen-Bundesliga: 2018–19, 2019–20
DFB-Pokal: 2018–19, 2019–20, 2020–21
UEFA Women's Champions League runner-up: 2019–2020

Germany
UEFA Women's Championship runner-up: 2022

References

External links

 

1991 births
Living people
German women's footballers
German people of Iranian descent
Sportspeople of Iranian descent
German people of Turkish descent
SG Wattenscheid 09 (women) players
SC 07 Bad Neuenahr players
1. FFC Turbine Potsdam players
SGS Essen players
VfL Wolfsburg (women) players
Eintracht Frankfurt (women) players
Footballers from Cologne
Germany women's international footballers
Women's association football midfielders
Frauen-Bundesliga players
2019 FIFA Women's World Cup players
Women's association football defenders
LGBT association football players
German LGBT sportspeople
UEFA Women's Euro 2022 players
UEFA Women's Euro 2017 players